General elections were held in Greenland on 5 March 1991. Siumut emerged as the largest party in the Parliament, winning 11 of the 27 seats.

Results

References

Elections in Greenland
Greenland
1991 in Greenland